Charles Pierce (July 14, 1926 – May 31, 1999) was one of the 20th century's foremost female impersonators, particularly noted for his impersonation of Bette Davis.

Life and career
Born in Watertown, New York, he began his show business career playing the organ and acting in radio dramas at station WWNY. He branched out into a comedy routine, attired in tuxedo, yet managing to evoke eerily convincing imitations of popular movie actresses. Eschewing the term drag queen, which he hated, he billed himself as a male actress.

Initially playing in small gay clubs, his fame spread. He took up residence in San Francisco, where his act became well known to Hollywood stars. As he toured, his costuming became more elaborate, initially adding small props, later full costume and makeup changes. His imitations were imitated by other female impersonators, and his roles included Bette Davis, Mae West, Tallulah Bankhead, Gloria Swanson, Carol Channing, Katharine Hepburn, and Joan Crawford, and these roles became the drag queen canon. His act was centered on wit rather than mimicry; however, it often was said that he looked more like Joan Collins than Joan Collins herself.

Carol Channing was one of two Hollywood celebrities Pierce "impersonated" who actually saw his act. She went backstage after a show at Gold Street in San Francisco (c. 1972) and said "Cheee-yarles: you do me better than I do!" The other star was Bette Davis who was snuck into the Studio One Backlot to see his show in the late 1970s. According to Pierce's longtime stage manager and dresser Kirk Frederick in his 2016 authorized Pierce biography, Davis was unimpressed with Pierce's portrayal and refused to go backstage after the show to greet Charles, saying "There is only one female impersonator who does me right, and his name is Arthur Blake." Pierce was never told Davis had attended the show. Shortly after the incident, Pierce was introduced to Davis at a private event through Geraldine Fitzgerald, a mutual friend. Frederick reports that Davis brushed off Pierce with the same reference to Blake but didn't mention attending the show.

He performed at many clubs in New York, including The Village Gate, Ted Hook's OnStage, The Ballroom, and Freddy's Supper Club. His numerous San Francisco venues included the Gilded Cage, Cabaret/After Dark, Gold Street, Bimbo's 365 Club, Olympus, The Plush Room, the Venetian Room at the Fairmont Hotel, Louise M. Davies Symphony Hall, and the War Memorial Opera House.

He was a guest actor on an episode of TV's Wonder Woman and played a cross-dressing villain in an episode of Laverne & Shirley ("Murder on the Moose Jaw Express"). Thanks in part to his good friend actress Dixie Carter, Pierce also appeared on an early episode of the sitcom Designing Women as a steward on a cruise ship. During the episode, he imitates Joan Collins (as the ship's waitress) and Bette Davis (as the ship's lounge entertainment). As Davis, he quips: "Was that Joan Collins hustling the tables? One bitch on this boat is enough!"

He died in North Hollywood, California, aged 72, and was cremated. His memorial service at Forest Lawn Memorial Park was carefully planned and scripted by Pierce before his death. Among those attending his memorial was his friend Bea Arthur, who closed with "I’ll See You Again." His ashes were interred in the Columbarium of Providence, Forest Lawn - Hollywood Hills Cemetery in Los Angeles, California.

In Bea Arthur's Tony Award-nominated one-woman show, Just Between Friends, which she played on Broadway and in London's West End, Arthur performed "A Mother's Ingenuity", Pierce's favorite joke. It can be heard in the cast recording.

Filmography

Discography
For Pierce'd Ears (live San Francisco performance), Wanda Records MP2101
''Les Natali presents Charles Pierce. Recorded live at Bimbo's, San Francisco- Blue Thumb Records- BTS-30   -1970

References

External links

A Charles Pierce tribute site
http://digitallibrary.usc.edu/cdm/landingpage/collection/p15799coll4 ONE National Gay & Lesbian Archives, University of Southern California Digital Archives
 Write That Down! The Comedy of Male Actress Charles Pierce, Page 82, Havenhurst Books, 2016 
 
 Charles Pierce Papers, 1954-1998, *T-Mss 1998-008, Billy Rose Theatre Division, New York Public Library for the Performing Arts
 
 

1926 births
1999 deaths
Male actors from San Francisco
People from Watertown, New York
Burials at Forest Lawn Memorial Park (Hollywood Hills)
Male actors from New York (state)
20th-century American male actors
American drag queens
20th-century LGBT people